Brian Head (born October 14, 1964) is an American composer, guitarist, and music theory and composition professor.
 
He performs frequently as a soloist and collaboratively with numerous groups, including the Los Angeles Philharmonic, the Los Angeles Opera, New World Symphony, inauthentica, Jacaranda and Xtet.  His compositions have been widely performed throughout the U.S. and abroad.

Brian Head holds an unusual dual appointment at the Thornton School of Music at the University of Southern California, where he is a member of both the Classical Guitar and the Composition faculties, positions he has held since 2001.  He maintains an active guitar studio there, lectures on a wide range of subjects, and directs the music theory program. As of 2010, he is the acting chair of the Classical Guitar department and Assistant Dean for curriculum.

From 2004-2010, Head led the Guitar Foundation of America as its president.  He now serves as the Artistic Director.

Training 

Raised in Adelphi, Maryland, Brian Head is the son of the noted trumpeter Emerson Head and his first wife Linda Head, a piano teacher and professional accompanist.  He received undergraduate degrees from the University of Maryland in both Music and Mathematics, and a master's degree from the University of Southern California in guitar performance, receiving recognition as Outstanding Thornton School Graduate of 1991.

Notable guitar teachers include Anthony Norris, William Kanengiser, and James Smith.

Notable compositions 
 "Sketches for Friends" (1994) was first recorded by William Kanengiser for his album Rondo alla Turka.
 "John McLaughlin: We Know You Know: Reverie for Mahavishnu" (2004) is featured on the Los Angeles Guitar Quartet's Grammy Award-winning album, Guitar Heroes.
 "Chant" and "Fanfare" are included in Scott Tennant's technique handbook Pumping Nylon.

External links 
 USC faculty
 Guitar Foundation of American Board of Directors
 LAGQ Grammy Award
 Absolute pitch among students in an American music conservatory: Association with tone language fluency

American male composers
20th-century American composers
American classical guitarists
American male guitarists
USC Thornton School of Music faculty
Living people
USC Thornton School of Music alumni
University of Maryland, College Park alumni
1964 births
People from Washington, D.C.
People from Adelphi, Maryland
20th-century American guitarists
20th-century American male musicians